Gigi Riva is an Italian former association football forward who represented the Italy national football team and he is the country's all-time top goalscorer. Since debuting for Italy against Hungary on 27 June 1965, Riva scored 35 goals in 42 appearances. He scored his first international goal in his fourth appearance for his country on 1 November 1967, as part of a hat-trick scored against Cyprus during a UEFA Euro 1968 qualifier match. Riva made his last appearance for Italy on 19 June 1974 in a 1–1 draw against Argentina during the 1974 FIFA World Cup.   

Riva scored a second hat-trick for his national team in a 4–1 win against Wales in a 1970 World Cup qualifier. He scored six times in total against Luxembourg, the most against any team. On 31 March 1973, he scored four goals against Luxembourg during a 1974 World Cup qualifier. He also scored a brace (two goals) seven times. Riva scored one goal at the UEFA European Championship, three goals at the World Cup, eight goals in friendly matches, nine goals in European Championship qualifiers and 14 goals in World Cup qualifiers.

Riva's first international tournament was the UEFA Euro 1968, where he scored the opening goal in the replay of the final helping Italy to a 2–0 win against Yugoslavia. Two years later, Riva scored three goals in the 1970 FIFA World Cup, twice against Mexico in a 4–1 victory in the quarter-finals and a goal in the 4–3 win against West Germany in the semi-finals after extra time.

International goals
<onlyinclude>
Scores and results list Italy's goal tally first, score column indicates score after each Riva goal.

Statistics

References

Italy national football team records and statistics
Riva, Gigi